Bruno Méndez Cittadini (born 10 September 1999) is a Uruguayan professional footballer who plays as a defender for Campeonato Brasileiro Série A club Corinthians.

Club career

Montevideo Wanderers
Méndez developed through the academy of Montevideo Wanderers and made his professional debut on 19 November 2017 against Rampla Juniors in a 1–0 home win. He scored his debut professional goal on 21 October 2018 against River Plate Montevideo in a 0–5 away win.

Corinthians
In February 2019, he signed a four-year contract with Corinthians.

Internacional (loan)

International career

Youth
Méndez is a former Uruguay youth international and has represented his nation at different age levels. He was also the captain of Uruguay team at 2019 South American U-20 Championship, 2019 FIFA U-20 World Cup and 2019 Pan American Games.

Senior
Following the injuries of Diego Godín and Marcelo Saracchi, he received maiden call-up to Uruguay senior team for friendlies against Brazil and France in November 2018. He made his debut in a friendly that was played in London against Brazil on 16 November 2018 and played the full game.

On 21 October 2022, Méndez was named in Uruguay's 55-man preliminary squad for the 2022 FIFA World Cup.

Career statistics

Club

International

Honours
Uruguay U20
 South American Games silver medal: 2018

References

External links
 

1999 births
Living people
Footballers from Montevideo
Association football defenders
Uruguayan footballers
Uruguay under-20 international footballers
Uruguay international footballers
Montevideo Wanderers F.C. players
Sport Club Corinthians Paulista players
Sport Club Internacional players
Uruguayan Primera División players
Campeonato Brasileiro Série A players
South American Games silver medalists for Uruguay
South American Games medalists in football
Uruguayan expatriate footballers
Uruguayan expatriate sportspeople in Brazil
Expatriate footballers in Brazil